Le comiche 2 is a 1991 Italian comedy film directed by Neri Parenti.

It is the sequel to 1990 film Le comiche and the second installment in the Comiche trilogy. A sequel entitled Le nuove comiche was released in 1994.

Cast

References

External links

Le comiche 2 at Variety Distribution

1991 films
Films directed by Neri Parenti
Films scored by Bruno Zambrini
1990s Italian-language films
1991 comedy films
Italian comedy films
1990s Italian films